The 1991–92 Michigan State Spartans men's basketball team represented Michigan State University in the 1991–92 NCAA Division I men's basketball season. The team played their home games at Breslin Center in East Lansing, Michigan and were members of the Big Ten Conference. They were coached by Jud Heathcote in his 16th year at Michigan State. The Spartans finished the season with a record of 22–8, 11–7 to finish in third place in Big Ten play. They received an at-large bid to the NCAA tournament as the No. 5 seed in the Midwest region, the school's third consecutive trip to the tournament. There they beat Southwest Missouri State before losing to Cincinnati in the Second Round in a rematch of an earlier Spartan win.

Previous season
The Spartans finished the 1990–91 season with an overall record of 19–11, 11–7 to finish in third place in the Big Ten. Michigan State received an at-large bid to the NCAA tournament as the No. 5 seed in the Midwest region. They beat Green Bay in the First Round and lost to Utah in the Second Round.

Roster 

Source

Schedule and results

|-
!colspan=9 style=| Non-conference regular season

|-
!colspan=9 style=| Big Ten regular season

|-
!colspan=9 style=|NCAA tournament

Rankings

Source.

Awards and honors
 Mike Peplowski – All-Big Ten First Team
 Mark Montgomery – All-Big Ten Third Team
 Shawn Respert – All-Big Ten Third Team

References

Michigan State Spartans men's basketball seasons
Michigan State
Michigan State
Michigan State Spartans men's b
Michigan State Spartans men's b